Saindhavi is a Carnatic music vocalist and an Indian film playback singer. She has been performing from the age of 12.

Personal life
Saindhavi married her schoolmate, composer G. V. Prakash Kumar, on 27 June 2013 in Chennai, India.
They were in relationship for 12 years before their wedding. The couple have a daughter.

Discography
Some of Saindhavi's Tamil film songs are listed here.

In Telugu, she sang "Maamidi komma ki" in Sekhar Kammula's film Avakai Biryani, "Yedho" in Sasirekha Parinayam, "Premadesam Yuvarani" in Shakti (along with Hemachandra), Sutiga Choodaku in  Ishq, a Telugu movie. In Kannada, she sang "Mussanje rangalli" and "Beladingalante minu minuguta" in the movie Psycho, which became a super-hit.

She has sung title songs for the TV series Idhu oru kaadhal kadhai, Edhir neechal, Chellamay Chellam and Magalir Mattum. She is also one of the lead vocalists in the popular series of albums Sacred Chants by Kosmic Music. Her devotional album on Lord Krishna titled "Alilayil Urangukinra Mayakkannane" was released in 2012 by Gaananjali Recordings.

Some of Saindhavi's Telugu film songs are listed here.

Television title songs
Athipookal - 2007
Valli - 2012
Tamil Selvi - 2019
Thalattu (TV Series) - 2021
 Thamizhum Saraswathiyhum -2021 (Star Vijay)

References

External links
 

Living people
Indian women playback singers
Tamil playback singers
Telugu playback singers
Women Carnatic singers
Carnatic singers
21st-century Indian singers
21st-century Indian women singers
Year of birth missing (living people)
Place of birth missing (living people)